The 1976 Toray Sillook Open  was a women's tennis tournament played on indoor carpet courts in Tokyo, Japan that was a non-tour event, independent of the 1976 WTA Tour. It was the fourth edition of the tournament and was held from 28 September through 2 October, 1976. The first round was played at the Nichi Dai University Auditorium while the semifinals and final were held at the Yoyogi National Gymnasium. The singles event was the only competition held and was won by unseeded Betty Stöve who earned $15,000 first-prize money.

Finals

Singles
 Betty Stöve defeated  Margaret Court 1–6, 6–4, 6–3

Prize money

References

1976 WTA Tour
Pan Pacific Open
Sports competitions in Tokyo
Toray Sillook Open
Toray Sillook Open
Toray Sillook Open
Toray Sillook Open
Toray Sillook Open